Cesano Boscone is a comune (municipality) in the Metropolitan City of Milan in the Italian region Lombardy, located about  southwest of Milan.

Cesano Boscone borders the following municipalities: Milan, Corsico, Trezzano sul Naviglio. It is served by Cesano Boscone railway station.

Main sights
Church of St. John the Baptist, traditionally founded by the Lombard queen Theodolinda in 613, after her conversion to Christianity.

Notable people
 
 
Francesco Navazzotti (born 1954), retired professional footballer

References

External links
 Official website

Cities and towns in Lombardy